Dick Robertson may refer to:

 Dick Robertson (songwriter) (1903–1979), American big band singer of the 1920s
 Dick Robertson (baseball) (1891–1944), American baseball pitcher
 Dick Robertson (footballer) (1877–1936), Australian rules footballer